Survey Camp is an army tradition that was discontinued in the later part of twentieth century but was reinstated in 2002 across the universities of the world with a whole new structure. It is the civil engineering training course for two weeks usually after completion  four semesters of bachelor of technology that consists of 8 days working in the field and 6 days of map preparation in the computer lab. Experts say that survey camp provides necessary foundation for civil engineers. Each day in the course there are at least 8 hours of working in the field. Students are divided into groups and they get out with practising surveyors and use their equipment out in the field. A camp incharge teacher appoints group leaders for each group; the leaders are responsible for all the works of his particular group and the equipment. In the computer lab, students learn applications such as AutoCAD and Carlson Survey. The students use these programs to take data collected from the field to develop topographic maps of the particular area. The basic aim of the survey camp is to know various works carried out in the industrial field by surveying, which includes determining the topography of particular area with the help of survey work, map study and reconnaissance work. The methods used for surveying are traversing, levelling and contouring

Instruments
The instruments used include:
 Theodolite (transit)
Total Station and Prism 
 Compass (prismatic and surveyor)
 Ranging rods
 Measuring Tape
 Levelling Staff
 Tripod stand (for optical instruments)
 Level (instrument)

Practicals
The survey practicals generally performed in Survey camp are listed below:
Simple levelling
Fly levelling
Trigonometric levelling
To determine and draw RL's of longitudinal and cross section of road.
Measuring horizontal angles by Ordinary, Repetition and Reiteration methods
Compass traversing
Gale traverse
Topographic map preparation

Procedure
The working rule used in survey camp is quite simple, all the groups of students are allotted different stations for survey work. For first couple of days, the students carry out traversing work to determine length of different sides of traverse and included angles between them. Then in next step RL (reduced level) of each station is determined with reference to permanent benchmark (the instruments used to determine reduced level include Auto Level with stand and Levelling Staff). Then RL of different points keeping specified spacing between them with reference to each station is determined. The points having same RL are joined to form contour lines and thus a topographic map of an area is prepared using AutoCAD or with the help of plane table survey.

Results
In Survey camp, students obtain extensive hands-on experience in the use of land surveying instruments and in the essentials of survey practice. Measurements of distances and angles, calculation and correction of errors are introduced. Concepts of higher order surveys and satellite navigation are reviewed and illustrated. Thus students learn surveying practically, this gives them confidence to work (with good precision and accuracy) in Industrial fields in the future.

See also
 Tape (surveying)
 Tape correction (surveying)
 Permanent adjustments of theodolites
 Temporary adjustments of theodolites

References

Surveying
Civil engineering
Career and technical education